Steffi Graf defeated Martina Hingis in the final, 4–6, 7–5, 6–2 to win the women's singles tennis title at the 1999 French Open. It was her Open Era record-extending 22nd and final major singles title, and she equaled Chris Evert's record of nine French Open final appearances. Graf also became the first player in the Open Era to defeat the top-three ranked players at the same major; defeating world No. 2 Lindsay Davenport in the quarterfinals, No. 3 Seles in the semifinals and No. 1 Hingis in the final. Hingis was attempting to complete the career Grand Slam in singles.

Arantxa Sánchez Vicario was the defending champion, but lost to Hingis in the semifinals.

This was the first major appearance for future world No. 1 and four-time French Open champion Justine Henin.

Seeds

Qualifying draw

Draw

Finals

Top half

Section 1

Section 2

Section 3

Section 4

Bottom half

Section 5

Section 6

Section 7

Section 8

References

External links
1999 French Open – Women's draws and results at the International Tennis Federation

Women's Singles
French Open by year – Women's singles
French Open - Women's Singles
1999 in women's tennis
1999 in French women's sport